Godley is a village in Grundy and Will counties, Illinois, United States.  The population was 601 at the 2010 census.

Geography
Godley is located at  (41.237292, -88.244693).

Demographics

At the 2000 census there were 594 people, 200 households, and 155 families living in the village. The racial makeup of the village was 96.46% White, 0.17% African American, 3.03% from other races, and 0.34% from two or more races. Hispanic or Latino of any race were 6.06%.

Of the 200 households 47.5% had children under the age of 18 living with them, 55.0% were married couples living together, 15.5% had a female householder with no husband present, and 22.5% were non-families. 17.5% of households were one person and 7.5% were one person aged 65 or older.  The average household size was 2.97 and the average family size was 3.37.

The age distribution was 37.4% under the age of 18, 8.6% from 18 to 24, 32.0% from 25 to 44, 14.6% from 45 to 64, and 7.4% 65 or older.  The median age was 28 years. For every 100 females, there were 98.0 males.  For every 100 females age 18 and over, there were 92.7 males.

The median household income was $42,857 and the median family income  was $43,036. Males had a median income of $37,422 versus $20,250 for females. The per capita income for the village was $14,238.  About 12.8% of families and 14.2% of the population were below the poverty line, including 19.1% of those under age 18 and 13.0% of those age 65 or over.

References

Villages in Grundy County, Illinois
Villages in Will County, Illinois
Villages in Illinois